Lagopsis may refer to:
 Lagopsis (mammal) - an extinct genus of animals in the family Ochotonidae
 Lagopsis (plant) - a genus of plants in the family Lamiaceae